Whiskey-class submarines (known in the Soviet Union as Projects 613, 640, 644, and 665) are a class of diesel-electric attack submarines that the Soviet Union built in the early Cold War period.

Design

The initial design was developed in the early 1940s as a sea-going follow on to the S-class submarine. As a result of war experience and the capture of German technology at the end of the war, the Soviets issued a new design requirement in 1946. The revised design was developed by the Lazurit Design Bureau based in Gorkiy. Like most conventional submarines designed 1946–1960, the design was heavily influenced by the Type XXI U-boat.

Patrol variants

Between 1949 and 1958 a total of 236 of an envisaged 340<ref>Kuzin, V.P.; Nikolskiy V.I. Voyenno-morskoy Flot SSSR 1945-1991. Istoricheskoye Morskoye Obshchestvo, Sankt Peterburg, 1996</ref> submarines of this type were commissioned into the Soviet Navy. The vessels were initially designed as coastal patrol submarines. These patrol variants are known in the west as Whiskey I, II, III, IV, and V and were called Project 613 in the Soviet Union.

Whiskey I − twin  guns in conning tower
Whiskey II − twin  guns and twin 25 mm guns
Whiskey III − guns removed
Whiskey IV − 25 mm guns
Whiskey V − no guns - streamlined conning tower and snorkel

Missile variants

In the 1950s and 1960s some Whiskey submarines were converted to guided missile submarines, with the capability to fire one to four SS-N-3 Shaddock cruise missiles. In 1956, the first prototype was ready. It was a regular Whiskey class modified with a launch tube aft of the sail containing a single SS-N-3c. This vessel was known in the West as Whiskey Single Cylinder. Between 1958 and 1960, six additional Whiskey-class submarines were converted to carry guided missiles. These boats had two missile tubes behind the sail, and were known in the west as the Whiskey Twin Cylinder, and Project 644 boats by the Soviets.

Between 1960 and 1963, six boats received an extended sail that could contain four Shaddock missiles. These were called Whiskey Long Bin in the West and Project 665 in the Soviet Union. All guided missile variants of the Whiskey class carried the P-5/ NATO SS-N-3c Shaddock land-attack missile, and had to surface in order to fire their missiles. The boats of the single and twin cylinder class also had to raise their missile tubes, which were normally positioned horizontally.

The "Long Bin" boats did not handle well, with the launch tubes causing stability problems, and water flow around the missile fittings was very noisy. All were soon retired from service. Four were converted to Project 640 radar picket boats (called Whiskey Canvas Bag in the West). Two were converted for "fishery research" and "oceanographic research" purposes.

Production programme

The Soviet Union built a total of 236 or 215 Whiskeys (sources vary; it appears the initial 21 Chinese-built boats are often included with the Soviet boats). Vice Admiral Burov, head of the Soviet Defense Ministry's Shipbuilding Institute from 1969 to 1983, confirms 215 units built.

Patrol submarines of the Whiskey class were exported to:

 Albania (four vessels, all retired) which were based at Porto Palermo 
 Bulgaria (two vessels, retired)
 China (five vessels, and another 21 built locally from parts provided by the Soviet Union, known as Type 03, all now retired)
 Egypt (seven vessels, retired)
 Indonesia (twelve vessels, and two as a source of spare parts, retired)
 North Korea (four vessels, inactive and likely retired)
 Poland (four vessels, 1962–1986, retired)
  (292)
  (295)
  (293)
  (294) – 10 June 1965 raising of the banner, 30 October 1985 lowering of the banner.

Cuba and Syria ordered used Whiskey-class submarines for use as battery charging hulks. The Syrian Navy boats were ex-Soviet Navy S-167, S-171, and S-183. The Cuban navy acquired an ex Soviet boat for Foxtrot class submarine  training. The guided missile and radar picket boats were never exported.

By 1982, only 60 boats remained in the Soviet Navy (45 active, 15 in operational reserve); all were retired by the end of the Cold War.

Incidents involving Whiskey-class submarines
 On 27 January 1961,  was lost due to accidental flooding while the boat was submerged. The valve that should have prevented water from entering the snorkel did not work properly.
 On 24 November 1972, the Kobben-class submarine KNM Sklinna of the Royal Norwegian Navy had "contact" with what they presumed was a Whiskey-class submarine, after 14 days of "hunt" in Sognefjord. Military documents released in 2009 confirm this episode.
 On 21 October 1981,  was run down by the merchant vessel Refrizherator-13 in Golden Horn Bay, Vladivostok.
 On 27 October 1981,  ran aground in Swedish territorial waters near the Karlskrona naval base.
On 19 June 1984, a Whiskey-class submarine was caught in a fishing-net and surfaced within the Norwegian economic exclusive zone.
 On 14 December 1989 a decommissioned Whiskey class soviet submarine under tow for scrapping in Nakskov was sunk 2 miles west of Bornholm. Attempts to raise it in 1991 failed and it sunk nearby in deeper water. 
 On 5 February 2007, the decommissioned  took on water and sank off the coast of Denmark while being towed to become part of a naval museum.
 In 2009 a previously unknown and unidentified sunken Whiskey-class submarine was discovered within Sweden's EEZ close to the island of Gotland. It was a decommissioned submarine which sank while under tow to be scrapped in Denmark. News of the discovery was not made public until March 2011.Forsvarsmakten.se

Surviving examples
S-189 is preserved as a museum in Saint Petersburg, Russia.  (ex-S-290) is preserved in Surabaya, Indonesia.

Notes

References
 

 Weir, Gary E., and Boyle, Walter J. Rising Tide: The Untold Story of the Russian Submarines That Fought the Cold War''  Basic Books, 2003.

External links

 History, Development, and Use of the Whiskey-class Submarine
 Encyclopedia of Ships 
 Whiskey class submarines - Complete Ship List (English)

Submarine classes
 
Submarines of the People's Liberation Army Navy
Russian and Soviet navy submarine classes
Submarines of the Korean People's Navy
Ships of the People's Liberation Army Navy